Santula is a vegetable dish from the state of Odisha in eastern India. It can be either fried (bhaja santula) or boiled (sijha santula). Ingredients include potatoes, brinjal, papaya, pumpkin and tomato, which are first boiled together, then fried in oil with diced onion, panch phoran, and green chillies.

Benefits
The dish is said to be easy to digest as it is not spicy and good for people suffering from stomach disorders. For one prescribed with fresh green vegetables, without spices and oil, nothing could be better than Santula.

References

Indian curries
Odia cuisine